Estadio La Raza is the main tennis court in Medellín, Colombia.  Built in 1958, it currently holds 10,000 spectators.

History

Usage

Surface

Location

Transportation

See also 
 Football in Colombia
 List of football stadiums in Colombia
List of South American stadiums by capacity

References

External links
 Stadium Site

 
Raza
Estadio La Raza
Sports venues completed in 1958
1958 establishments in Colombia